"Pigs on the Wing" is a two-part song by English rock band Pink Floyd from their 1977 concept album Animals, opening and closing the album. According to various interviews, it was written by Roger Waters as a declaration of love to his new wife Carolyne Christie. The song is significantly different from the other three songs on the album, "Dogs," "Pigs" and "Sheep," in that the other songs are dark, whereas this one is lighter-themed, as well as also being much shorter in duration, with each part at under a minute and a half while the others are all at least 10 minutes in length.

The title comes from an expression used by British pilots during World War II to describe enemy fighters in a plane's blindspot.

Composition
The song is divided into two parts, which are the first and last tracks of the album. Both are in stark contrast to the album's middle three songs. Without the inclusion of this track on Animals, Waters thought the album "would have just been a kind of scream of rage."

According to Pink Floyd drummer Nick Mason, and confirmed by Waters, it is a love song directed towards Waters' new wife at the time, Carolyne. She was really the only one of Waters' friends Mason had ever met who could hold her own in an argument with Waters. According to Mason, someone had to be very good with semantics to win an argument against Waters. Waters wrote the song because that is what he had been looking for all along: someone who could stand up to him, an equal.

The songs are constructed simply and feature no instrumentation besides a strummed acoustic guitar played by Waters.

A special version of the song was made for the 8-track cartridge release. This version of the song links Part 1 and Part 2 with a guitar solo, performed by Snowy White, who would later play the guitar solo in live performances on the 1977 In the Flesh Tour. The complete version of the song, including the instrumental bridge, was re-released on White's Goldtop compilation album in 1995.

Reception
In a review for Animals, Brice Ezell of Consequence of Sound described "Pigs on the Wing (Part One)" as "a brief acoustic framing device. Its major key signature is a clear contrast to the frequently sinister riffs that form the landscape of 'Dogs,' 'Pigs (Three Different Ones)' and 'Sheep.'" He described "Part Two" as "a reminder that humans find ways to stick together even amidst the turmoil of a cravenly capitalist world."

Personnel
 Roger Waters – acoustic guitar, lead vocals
 Snowy White – electric guitar solo (8-track version only)
 Richard Wright – Hammond organ (8-track version only)

References

Footnotes

Bibliography 

Pink Floyd songs
1977 songs
Folk rock songs
Songs written by Roger Waters
Song recordings produced by David Gilmour
Song recordings produced by Roger Waters
Song recordings produced by Richard Wright (musician)
Song recordings produced by Nick Mason
Harvest Records singles
wing